Chris Bender may refer to:

Chris Bender (film producer) (born 1971), American film producer
Chris Bender (singer) (1972–1991), American R&B singer